Trapeang Prasat District is a district in Oddar Meanchey Province in northern Cambodia. According to the 2008 census of Cambodia, it had a population of 25,533.

Administration 
The following table shows the villages of Trapeang Prasat District by commune.

References

Districts of Oddar Meanchey province